Russian money has been prevalent in London since the dissolution of the Soviet Union in 1991, following which many Russian oligarchs sought to invest their wealth in other countries. British Government policy encouraged the flow of foreign capital into the United Kingdom, for example through the foreign investor visa routes, introduced during John Major's premiership in 1994, one-fifth of whose recipients since 2008 are Russian citizens. Additional funds flow to British overseas territories, commonly used as tax havens, such as the Cayman Islands and British Virgin Islands. The concept is commonly associated with the terms "Londongrad" and "Moscow-on-Thames".

Over £27bn is invested by Russian citizens in the United Kingdom. Amongst the investments are Premier League football clubs, Scottish country estates, and The Evening Standard. Tate art institution was supported by Viktor Vekselberg and Peter Aven. Alexander Mamut invested £100m to Waterstones bookstore chain after acquiring it in 2011 for £53m. According to its managing director James Daunt, the intervention saved Waterstones, which managed to make its first annual profit since 2008 in 2016. He later remarked that continued Russian ownership would've been "catastrophic" for the chain in 2022.

According to Transparency International, at least £1.5bn is invested into UK property by Russians "accused of financial crime or with links to the Kremlin". In 2018, following the poisoning of Sergei and Yulia Skripal, a report titled "Moscow's Gold: Russian Corruption in the UK" was published by the Foreign Affairs Committee. In 2020, the Intelligence and Security Committee said that the influence of Russian business was so deeply embedded in the British financial system that it "cannot be untangled".

Following the 2022 Russian invasion of Ukraine there was a political desire to take action against UK-based oligarchs. Unexplained wealth orders are expected to be better enforced and foreign investor routes scrapped. The Economic Crime Bill was also revived and it includes a register to improve transparency of ultimate land ownership, currently obscured through the use of shell companies. Reuters reported that some Russian citizens have been making ownership changes and consulting lawyers to shield their assets.

See also 
 
 History of Russia (1991–present)#"Shock therapy"
 Russians in the United Kingdom
 Shock doctrine

References

Further reading 
 
 
 Londongrad: From Russia with Cash; The Inside Story of the Oligarchs. Mark Hollingsworth,  Stewart Lansley.   Published May 5, 2009.

Economy of London
Privatization in Russia

Wealth in Russia